Firth Wood is a woodland in South Yorkshire, England, near the village of Oughtibridge. It is owned and managed by the Woodland Trust.

References

Forests and woodlands of South Yorkshire